Lothaire Bluteau (born 14 April 1957) is a Canadian actor.

Biography 
He was born in Montreal, Quebec, and performs in both French and English. Bluteau has worked in theatre, film and television throughout Canada and internationally. He abandoned medicine for the theatre and was first noticed for his performance as a mentally challenged youth in Yves Simoneau's In the Shadow of the Wind (Les Fous de Bassan). After receiving great acclaim for the lead in the stage version of Being at Home with Claude, he won a best actor Genie Award for his performance in Denys Arcand's Oscar-nominated Jésus de Montréal. He has since appeared in Black Robe and Robert Lepage's Le Confessionnal, and his international credits include Orlando (1992) and I Shot Andy Warhol (1996).

He had a recurring role in the third season of the television series 24 as the character Marcus Alvers. In the fourth season of The Tudors, he played Charles de Marillac, the French ambassador to the court of King Henry VIII. In July 2014, it was announced he was cast in the History Channel series Vikings as the 9th century King of France, Charles the Bald.

Awards and recognition 
Bluteau won the 1990 Genie Award for Best Performance by an Actor in a Leading Role for his work on Jesus of Montreal and was nominated for the same award in 1996 for his work in the film The Confessional (Le Confessionnal). He was nominated for the AFI Award for Best Actor for his work on Black Robe.

Bluteau won the award for Best Actor at the 1997 Gijón International Film Festival for his work on Bent.

Selected filmography
 Les Fils de la liberté, 1980 (TV)
 Jeune délinquant, 1980 (TV series, 3 episodes)
 Just a Game (Rien qu’un jeu), 1983
 Un Gars d’la place, 1983
 The Years of Dreams and Revolt (Les Années de rêves), 1984
 Les Enfants mal aimés, 1984
 Un Gars d’la place, 1985
 Sonia, 1986
 Miami Vice, 1986 (TV series, 1 episode)
 In the Shadow of the Wind (Les Fous de Bassan), 1987
 La Nuit avec Hortense, 1987
 Bonjour Monsieur Gauguin, 1988
 Mourir, 1988
 La Nuit avec Hortense, 1988
 Jesus of Montreal (Jésus de Montréal), 1989
 Black Robe, 1991
 The Persistence of Memory, 1991
 Orlando, 1992
 , 1992
 Mrs. 'Arris Goes to Paris, 1992 (TV movie)
 The Confessional (Le Confessionnal), 1995
 Other Voices, Other Rooms, 1995
 I Shot Andy Warhol, 1996
 Nostromo, 1997 (TV miniseries, 4 episodes)
 Bent, 1997
 Conquest, 1998
 Animals, 1998
 Shot Through the Heart, 1998 (TV movie)
 Senso unico, 1999
 Law & Order: Special Victims Unit, 1999 (TV series, 1 episode, "Sophomore Jinx", Professor James Henri Rousseau)
 Restless Spirits, 1999 (TV movie)
 Urbania, 2000
 Oz, 2000 (TV series, 1 episode)
 Solitude, 2001
 Law & Order: Criminal Intent, 2001 (TV series, 1 episode, "Enemy Within", Richard Zainer)
 Dead Heat, 2002
 Snow Dogs, 2002 - Mack
 Julie Walking Home, 2002
 Law & Order: Special Victims Unit, 2003 (TV series, 1 episode, "Pandora", Erich Tassig)
 On Thin Ice, 2003 (TV movie)
 24, 2004 (TV series, 5 episodes)
 Gérald L’Ecuyer: A Filmmaker’s Journey, 2004 (TV movie)
 Third Watch, 2004 (TV, 1 episode)
 Desolation Sound, 2005
 Law & Order: Trial by Jury, 2006 (TV series, 1 episode, "Eros in the Upper Eighties", Andres Voychek)
 Disappearances, 2006
 Walk All Over Me, 2007
 Race to Mars (TV mini-series, 2 episodes)
 The Funeral Party, 2007
 The Tudors, Charles de Marillac, 2007–2010 (TV series)
 The Child Prodigy (L'Enfant prodige), 2010
 Missing, 2012 (TV series, 1 episode)
 The Storm Within (Rouge sang), 2013
 Law & Order: Special Victims Unit, 2014 (TV series, 1 episode, "Gambler's Fallacy", Anton Nadari)
 Vikings, 2015–2016 (TV, 13 episodes)
 Regression, 2015
 Criminal Minds: Beyond Borders, 2016 (TV, 1 episode)
 The Switch (La Switch), 2022

Selected theater credits
 The Resistible Rise of Arturo Ui (National Actors Theatre/The Michael Schimmel Center for the Arts at Pace University, New York, 2002), Young Inna/Defendant Fish
 The Cherry Orchard (Mark Taper Forum, Los Angeles, 2006), Gaev

References

External links

 

1957 births
Living people
French Quebecers
Canadian male film actors
Male actors from Montreal
Canadian male stage actors
Canadian male television actors
Best Actor Genie and Canadian Screen Award winners
20th-century Canadian male actors
21st-century Canadian male actors